The International Committee of the Fourth International (ICFI) is the name of two Trotskyist internationals; one with sections named Socialist Equality Party which publishes the World Socialist Web Site, and another linked to the Workers Revolutionary Party in the UK.

Foundation
The International Committee originated as a public faction of the Fourth International. It was formed in 1953 by a number of national sections of the FI that disagreed with the course of the International Secretariat of the Fourth International led at that time by Michel Pablo (Raptis) and Ernest Mandel (Germain). The Committee was co-ordinated by the American section, the Socialist Workers Party, and included the British section led by Gerry Healy and Pierre Lambert's Internationalist Communist Party (PCI) in France. Trotskyist groups in various other countries, notably in Switzerland, China, Canada and Nahuel Moreno's group in Argentina, also joined.

The grouping's founding statement was an open letter of the National Committee of the SWP which outlined the disputes it had with Pablo's faction within the International Secretariat of the Fourth International. It reiterated what it saw as the basic principles of Trotskyism and described the direction of the "Pabloite" faction as "revisionist", claiming that this threatened the survival of the Fourth International, the liquidation of the Trotskyist program and definite steps taken towards its organisational liquidation. As an example, the letter explained that Pablo expelled a majority of the French section of the International, because they disagreed with the International's policy of working within the Stalinist Communist Party of France. This policy was described as one of entrism sui generis, entryism of a special kind, in which the Trotskyists were to join the Stalinist or Socialist mass parties with a long term perspective of working within them.

Some critics of the Open Letter counter that the SWP and their co-thinkers in The Club had failed to defend the French majority against Pablo, and that they had shared the 1951 perspectives of International on war-revolutions and the need for deep entryism in the Communist Parties. The Club's entryism into the Labour Party in Britain resembled entrism sui generis. However, Pablo aimed for the FI to implement entryism more deeply than the leaders of the ICFI felt wise: They were also concerned by Pablo preparedness to enforce entrism, if necessary by splitting sections or appointing new leadership teams.

The Open Letter went on to explain that, in the SWP's view, what it described as Pabloite Revisionism was the result of a lack of confidence in the revolutionary capabilities of the working class and an impressionistic, overly positive, assessment of the strength and prospects of Stalinism. Pablo had, in 1951, argued that the transition between capitalism and socialism will probably take several centuries. The supporters of the Open Letter read this to suggest there would be "centuries of deformed workers states", and this phrase is often mistaken attributed to Pablo or to his formulation of what was called the war-revolution thesis.

The ICFI saw this as an abandonment of the principles that Trotsky fought for since the rise of Hitler and the consequent establishment of the Fourth International. The founders of the ICFI wanted the International to maintain its organizational independence as the world party of the working-class, asserting that Pablo's policies would leave them an adjunct of the Stalinists. His faction's heavy-handed tactics of removing members who disagreed with his radical revisions made compromise appear impossible.

An excerpt from the concluding part of the "Open Letter" reads:

"To sum up: The lines of cleavage between Pablo’s revisionism and orthodox Trotskyism are so deep that no compromise is possible either politically or organizationally. The Pablo faction has demonstrated that it will not permit democratic decisions truly reflecting majority opinion to be reached. They demand complete submission to their criminal policy. They are determined to drive all orthodox Trotskyists out of the Fourth International or to muzzle and handcuff them."

"Their scheme has been to inject their Stalinist conciliationism piecemeal and likewise in piecemeal fashion, get rid of those who come to see what is happening and raise objections."

Linked below is a history of the founding of the ICFI and the "Open Letter".

1953–1963
In the eyes of the ICFI, Pabloite entryism sui generis meant liquidationism or a permanent dissolution into the Communist Party in every country. After the ICFI withdrew from the FI in 1953, many sections of the ISFI entered communist parties. However, it later became clear that the sections of the ISFI did not dissolve, or enter permanently. Nevertheless, the ISFI's political trajectory led its sections to mistakes as well as, in one case, participation in bourgeois governments when the Lanka Sama Samaja Party (LSSP) entered the government of Ceylon and was expelled from the International. The ICFI sees similar pressures at work now: describing as "Pabloites" those former Trotskysists who today are enforcing IMF dictates in Brazil as members of the Lula government.

Some sections of the ICFI have practiced temporary entryist policies, but continually emphasized to their membership that this was a short-term move. They maintained, however, the principle that only the Fourth International, as a consciously Marxist organization of the working class can lead the world revolution.

The SWP, partly because of McCarthyism and politically repressive laws, found it hard to cooperate on a world scale in a democratic centralist International. The first conference could not take place until 1958, and the SWP officially only acted as observers at the event, being prevented from affiliating to the ICFI by US law.

As early as the 1956 Hungarian Revolution, the leadership of the American SWP was beginning to show signs of convergence with the developing political line of the organisations grouped in the ISFI. The disappearance of the Socialist Union of America, the American affiliate of the ISFI, removed one such barrier to a political reunion. Ever greater agreement with regard to the Algerian War of Independence, and the Cuban Revolution of 1959 also brought the SWP and the ISFI closer together. Meanwhile, inside the ISFI, Pablo had lost much of his political influence, removing yet another barrier to reunification. In 1962, the ICFI and ISFI formed a Parity Committee to organise a World Congress of the two factions.

ISFI and the leadership of SWP revised the basic Trotskyist principle that only a conscious Marxist leadership can ensure a successful socialist revolution. Instead they argued that "unconscious Trotskyists" would come to power in colonized countries as well as within the Stalinist bureaucracies. It was no longer necessary to build a mass Trotskyist party. Anyone who opposed these conceptions was silenced or expelled, breaking with the basic Leninist principle of inner-party democracy.

In 1963 the SWP and the smaller Swiss, Canadian, Chinese and Latin American sections of the ICFI agreed to reunite with the ISFI at the World Congress, to form the United Secretariat of the Fourth International.

This was immediately opposed by the Revolutionary Tendency of the SWP, and by the SLL in Britain and the PCI in France, as well as many orthodox Trotskyists throughout the world. Those currents still valued the political lessons learned from the 1953 split. They saw the SWP's decision as an abandonment of the most basic principles of the Fourth International, and of Trotskyism, and as an attempt to ingratiate itself to the growing middle class protest movement in the United States.

The RT, SLL and PCI argued that the anti-war movement in the US contained the same types of people the Pabloites had sought to attract during the mass exodus of people from the Stalinist Parties after the revelations of Stalin's atrocities in the 1950s. They called this "opportunism" because it represented what they saw as a revision of Marxism for the sake of attracting new members from the radicalizing middle class.

1963–1971
Within the SWP, as well as within the rest of the ICFI, an opposition to the reunification came together. Some of the Latin American sections of the ICFI also left the ICFI to join the USFI, allowing the SWP and its allies to claim that a majority of the sections of the ICFI had joined the USFI. In the eyes of the ICFI, the Latin American sections had adopted Pabloism and were dependent on their connections to the SWP.

Within the SWP, some members who had studied the meaning of the 1953 split opposed the reunification. These were gathered around Tim Wohlforth and James Robertson in the Revolutionary Tendency. They echoed the SWPs Open Letter, arguing that the leaders' turn to Pabloism coincided with the introduction of Stalinist ideas, followed by an expulsion of those members who exposed the leadership's lack of principles. The SWP had supported the Cuban Revolution led by Fidel Castro. However, Robertson's followers embarrassed Wohlforth and the SLL by suggesting that the SWP could not be saved. With Wohlforth laying the evidentiary basis for claims of "party disloyalty" the RT leaders were expelled from the party, forming Spartacist.

Wohlforth now led a Reorganized Minority Tendency until the tiny group of 9 people was also expelled from the SWP early in the fall of 1964. Wohlforth and his associates went on to found the American Committee for the Fourth International, the official organ of which was a bimonthly mimeographed publication, the Bulletin of International Socialism, launched on September 24, 1964.

When the Fourth International had split in 1953 the Lanka Sama Samaja Party of Sri Lanka (LSSP) refused to take any side and maintained contacts with both the ISFI and ICFI while arguing for a joint congress. After the ISFI criticised the LSSP's parliamentary tactics in 1960, the LSSP was the notable absence from the ISFI's 1961 World Congress. In 1964, the LSSP joined the bourgeois government of Sri Lanka, which the ICFI and USFI condemned as betraying Trotskyist principles. The ICFI and USFI no longer considered the LSSP a Trotskyist party at that point, and encouraged Sri Lankan Trotskyists to leave that party. Some time later a new organization, the Revolutionary Communist League was formed out of the left wing which split from the LSSP to form the Lanka Sama Samaja Party (Revolutionary).

In 1966, a "third world conference" of the ICFI occurred in England. Delegates were present from the SLL, Lambert's PCI and Loukas Karliaftis’s Greek organisation, which had joined the IC in 1964. Michel Varga, a PCI member, represented the exile Hungarian League of Revolutionary Socialists, which he had founded in 1962. Two groups from the US sent delegates: that of Tim Wohlforth and that of James Robertson. Observers came from a group in French-speaking Africa, a small group in Germany later to form the Bund Sozialistischer Arbeiter, and individuals who had left USFI sections in Ceylon and Denmark. Non-voting observers came from Voix Ouvrière and a state capitalist tendency in Japan.

One result of this Congress was the expulsion of the Spartacist tendency after the failure of Robertson to attend a conference session. Robertson said this was due to exhaustion; the IC argued that Roberton's alleged refusal to apologise reflected a rejection of communist methods, and he was asked to leave. The Spartacists would go on to form the International Spartacist Tendency. The ICFI now claims that the Sparticists were never interested in an agreement, and desired to go off in their own direction.

If the Sparticists did not desire to break off into their own organization, the ICFI now argues, a misunderstanding at the conference could have been solved. The ICFI also says the Sparticists are nationalist in their orientation, refusing to be controlled by an international organization, as well as supporting politically affirmative action, black nationalism, Stalinist regimes and denying the existence of globalization.

In the wake of the 1966 congress, pressures started to build between the SLL and PCI. The Congress did not attempt to present the ICFI as 'the Fourth International', rather it positioned the IC as a force that defended what it saw as the political continuity of Trotskyism and called for the 'rebuilding and reconstruction of the Fourth International'. The PCI came to feel that the SLL was ultimatistic, because the SLL argued that the programme of the IC had to be the basis for further revolutionary organisation. The PCI's differences were reflected in its openness to the Algerian MNA and the Bolivian POR. Early in 1967 the PCI changed its name to Organisation Communiste Internationaliste (OCI), a move that also suggested the OCI's greater modesty. By May 1967, the OCI argued that the IC was not functioning well, and that key decisions of the 1966 conferences "remained dead letters". It argued: "The SLL has had its own international activity, so has the OCI. Germany and Eastern Europe have remained the 'private hunting-grounds' of the OCI...".

By the late 1960s all far left tendencies were growing and the ICFI was no exception. Increased membership, cheaper airflights and phone contact also allowed contacts to become more regular overseas. In this way the ICFI was able to grow in Sri Lanka. New sections appeared in Germany, in 1971, and Ireland.

1971–1985
The OCI and its supporters around the ICFI left the ICFI in 1971. This reflected growing differences, primarily over the OCI's support for the Partido Obrero Revolucionario (POR) and the SLL's emphasis on Marxist philosophy in the training of its newer members.

Both the SLL and OCI were at this point developing connection to Trotskyists in other countries, but in different ways.
 The OCI had sought to bring the Bolivian POR into the ICFI. In addition to these groups the OCI was cultivating the exiled Hungarian League of Revolutionary Socialists (LRSH) led by Michel Varga, a former leader of the students during the Hungarian Revolution of 1956 and of the German Socialist Workers League (BSA). Moreover, the Argentine Workers' Policy group led by Jorge Altamira was close to the OCI. In general, the OCI rejected the strident point of view of the SLL important to educate the newer members on the philosophical underpinnings of Marxism. The OCI advocated a more measured approach. More importantly, differences over the actual development of the revolution, especially in Latin America forced the break between the OCI and SLL. Almost all of the ICFI in Latin America went to the new pro-OCI international tendency leaving the SLL supporters there with only a handful of members, notably in Bolivia and Peru. The SLL took the majority of the ICFI in Greece which went on to build a very influential organization in that country under the Colonels.
 The SLL claims, on the other hand were looking to bring newer forces into the ICFI that shared its approach: in the shape of the League for a Workers Republic in Ireland and the Revolutionary Communist League of Ceylon, in addition to the Workers League in the USA. The SLL fought to make dialectical materialism the cornerstone of its political approach.

The contest between the two political lines could not last and in 1971 the OCI and its allies would leave the ICFI to form their own international tendency, which later became known as the Organising Committee for the Reconstruction of the Fourth International. In 1979 it fused with a grouping led by Nahuel Moreno. The ICFI later considered this a major tragedy, stemming from the relative inexperience of the majority of the members entering into revolutionary politics during a revolutionary upsurge of the international working class. The OCI and the OCRFI considered the ICFI to be an ossicifed political sect incapable of growing beyond their 'mother' section in the UK. The OCRFI in fact outpaced the ICFI in growth from then on. Some members of OCI continued to support the ICFI, however, which allowed the ICFI to regain a very small foothold in French politics. Some members of the SLL continued to support the OCI, later the PCI as it became known and set up the Socialist Labour Group in Britain, affiliated with the OCRFI and defending their positions. It was joined shortly afterward by the above-mentioned League for a Workers Republic in Ireland, further depleting the ICFI ranks.

Delegates from eight countries attended the fourth world conference of the IC in April 1972. In conjunction with a massive growth in membership and preparations for what they believed would be "mass influence", the SLL renamed itself the Workers Revolutionary Party in 1974 and remained a part of the ICFI along with affiliated sections in Ireland, Greece, Germany, Spain, Australia, the USA, Ceylon and Peru.

Security and the Fourth International
In the middle of the 1970s, two leaders of the ICFI group in the United States, Workers' League, developed political differences with the majority: Tim Wohlforth and Nancy Fields, his partner. A number of political and organisational disputes unfolded, which the ICFI described as a series of disruptions and expulsions animated by Fields. It was brought to the attention of the Workers' League's Central Committee that Fields' uncle had worked for the CIA's computer division, and it criticized the fact that neither Fields nor Wohlforth had revealed that to the League. Fields and Wohlforth had denied that Fields had connections with state agencies. In August 1974, the League's central committee suspended Fields from membership and removed Wohlforth as national secretary pending a commission of inquiry, in a unanimous vote that included Wohlforth's. Both left the League and eventually joined the SWP for a few years. An investigation conducted by the Workers' League concluded that Fields did not have connections to the CIA and the two were requested to resume their membership. However, they refused.

Wohlforth wrote an extended attack on the International Committee in Intercontinental Press. Intercontinental Press began a campaign denouncing the ICFI for the Wohlforth incident, with its editor Joseph Hansen writing that the concern over security indicated "paranoia" on the part of the IC's central leader, Gerry Healy. The ICFI thought this reaction was surprising, given the role that state infiltration had played in the Trotskyist movement, including in the assassination of Trotsky. In addition, this came only a few years after the revelations of the US government's Cointelpro program, in which the FBI illegally infiltrated many groups and political parties and conducted provocations against opponents of the war in Vietnam. From 1961 to 1976, fifty-five FBI informants held SWP offices or committee positions and fifty-one served on executive committees of the party.

In May 1975, the sixth congress of the ICFI initiated a "Security and the Fourth International" investigation into "the circumstances surrounding the assassination of Leon Trotsky". By mid-1977, the Security campaign used publicly available government documents, and court testimony by Soviet agents tried in the United States, to allege that some leading figures of the American SWP, including a figure close to Leon Trotsky, were agents of the US or USSR governments. They noted that Joseph Hansen had met FBI agents numerous times over a number of months in 1940 to give them information about Stalinists in the US alleged to have participated in the assassination of Trotsky, and claimed that this was done without the knowledge of the Trotskyist movement. FBI documents describing these meetings were published by the Workers League. Hansen claimed that this contact had been agreed by the SWP's leadership. Felix Morrow, who had been an SWP leader in 1940, said in 1975 that he thought that the SWP would not have authorised Hansen's meetings. The ICFI concluded that the documents, along with FBI documents suggesting that Hansen had met with a recruiter for the Stalinist GPU two years before Trotsky's assassination, and his refusal to answer questions put, showed that Hansen was a government agent.

The investigation intensified in 1978 after the decision by the SWP leadership to warn Alan Gelfand, a lawyer who had joined the SWP late in 1975, just after the start of the 'Security' Campaign. In 1977 and 1978 Gelfand asked questions concerning the Workers League's charges inside the SWP. In March 1978, Gelfand was warned by the local executive committee against publicly questioning the leadership of the SWP. Rather than attempt to answer Gelfand's concerns, the political committee considered the raising of these questions as a slander against Hansen, and warned Gelfand in April 1978 that he would be disciplined if he continued to seek answers.

In December 1978, Gelfand took the US Government to court: his brief summarised the Workers League's charges and demanded that the US government name its informers in the SWP. The SWP expelled him the following month, leading Gelfand to take both the US Government and the SWP to court, arguing that since those expelling him were, in his opinion, agents of the US government, his civil liberties were being infringed upon by the US Government.

The ICFI came to Gelfand's aid and, in the course of the trial, made many claims about US government infiltration into the SWP as part of CoIntelPro and earlier. The ICFI also wanted to investigate infiltration by the USSR, considering the resources that the Stalinists had devoted to infiltrating and physically destroying the Fourth International culminating in the murders of Erwin Wolfe in Spain, Lev Sedov in France, and Leon Trotsky in Mexico. It had been known that the murderer of Trotsky had been a boyfriend of one of his secretaries, who was introduced to her by a Stalinist agent in France. The investigation of the ICFI later revealed that Cannon's secretary, Sylvia Callen, had been a Stalinist informer working through the CPUSA, and had been formerly married to a KGB agent, a fact that was confirmed by Grand Jury testimony. (See External link to FBI file on Jack Soble, at bottom of this page.) The judge in the Gelfand case only released the grand jury testimony after the case had been closed.

The ICFI's investigation into the SWP and defense of Alan Gelfand was opposed by almost all Trotskyist groups: no current outside the ICFI supported it. Most Trotskyist organisations joined forces to defend the SWP leadership, including the United Secretariat of the Fourth International, Pierre Lambert's OCI, Nahuel Moreno's PST, Robertson's Spartacist League, the Chinese RCP, Lutte Ouvrière, the Revolutionary Workers Party in Sri Lanka and the SWP united to brand it "a Shameless Frame-up". After the Workers' Revolutionary Party left the ICFI in 1985, WRP secretary Cliff Slaughter also repudiated the investigation.

Both sides claimed that the other had no factual detail to support its charges: The ICFI argues that the defense of the SWP leadership, and the charge that the ICFI's campaign was a 'frame up,' are slanders against Workers' League without factual backing. Those who supported the SWP against the ICFI argued that it was a breach of socialist principals to bring the courts into the labour movement, (although the ICFI did not bring the courts in, a supporter of the ICFI who was in the SWP did) and that the ICFI's charge that the SWP was controlled by agents of the US and Soviet states to be groundless.

1985–present

By the end of the 1970s, the revolutionary upsurge of the 1960s and 1970s had subsided. Membership of the ICFI fell, and the WRP leadership was not prepared for this. It entered into alliances with nationalist leaders in the under-developed countries.

This aroused the consternation of some members throughout the ICFI. The WRP had gained members and prominence in Great Britain, but the leadership increasingly went its own way against the ICFI as a whole.

This conflict erupted in the mid-1980s and ended with the disintegration of the WRP. The various currents of the WRP attempted to found their own ICFIs each claiming to be the official one, yet they did not break with their old policies systematically and won no new international support. North and his supporters gained the allegiance of half of the remaining national sections, with the Greek, Spanish and Peruvian sections splitting and the German, Australian, and Sri Lankan sections, as well as a fraternal grouping in Ecuador, supporting North. The other ICFI is based on the surviving group that still holds the name of WRP and refers to itself as the British section of an ICFI, with other sections in Russia/Ukraine, Sri Lanka and Greece. The Russian section is called the Workers Revolutionary League which is the Soviet section of the ICFI and has members in Russia, Ukraine and Belarus. (Source 'Marxist Review' September 2008 Volume 23 Issue Number 8)

Anticipating an outbreak of US militarism after the collapse of the USSR, the ICFI associated with the SEP prepared for a new radicalization of the working class. For this reason, its sections reorganised into Socialist Equality Parties throughout the world.

After a year of internal discussion, in 1998 the ICFI launched the World Socialist Web Site.

Current sections [SEP]
Australia - Socialist Equality Party (Australia)
Canada - Socialist Equality Party (Canada)
France - Socialist Equality Party (France)
Germany - Socialist Equality Party (Germany)
Sri Lanka - Socialist Equality Party (Sri Lanka)
Turkey - Socialist Equality Group [Sosyalist Eşitlik Grubu] (After its application to the ICFI was accepted, the group has announced in its statement it was officially forming as the Socialist Equality Party in Turkey)
United Kingdom - Socialist Equality Party (UK)
United States - Socialist Equality Party (United States)

There are also groups working to build SEPs in other countries:
Brazil - Socialist Equality Group
Croatia - Socialist Equality Group
India - ICFI / WSWS Supporters - India 
Ireland - Socialist Equality Group
New Zealand - Socialist Equality Group
Pakistan - Marxist Voice
Romania - ICFI / WSWS Supporters - Romania
Russia - Young Guard of the Bolshevik-Leninists in Russia

Major publications
"The Heritage We Defend", a review of the postwar history of the Fourth International, by David North.
How the WRP Betrayed Trotskyism
The ICFI Defends Trotskyism
Trotskyism vs. Revisionism Volume 1: The Fight Against Pabloism In The Fourth International (1974) , this volume contains documents from the period leading up to the 1953 split in the Fourth International and includes James P Cannon's Open Letter.
Trotskyism vs. Revisionism Volume 2: The Split In The Fourth International (1974) , this volume contains documents from the 1953 split in the Fourth International.
Trotskyism vs. Revisionism Volume 3: The Socialist Workers Party's Road back to Pabloism (1974) , this volume contains documents from the struggle within the International Committee against the turn by the most of its sections towards reunification with the International Secretariat.
Trotskyism vs. Revisionism Volume 4: The International Committee Against Liquidationism (1974) , this volume contains documents from the 1963 reunification of most of the ICFI with the United Secretariat.
Trotskyism vs. Revisionism Volume 5: The Fight for the Continuity of the Fourth International (1975) , this volume contains documents from the 1966 World Congress of the ICFI.
Trotskyism vs. Revisionism Volume 6: The Organisation Communiste Internationaliste Breaks with Trotskyism (1975) , this volume contains documents relating to the 1971 split by the French Organization Communiste Internationaliste (OCI) with the ICFI.
Trotskyism vs. Revisionism Volume 7: The Fourth International and the Renegade Wohlforth (1984), this volume contains documents from the political struggle waged within the Workers League against Tim Wohlforth, who deserted his post as national secretary in 1973.
Marxism, Opportunism and the Balkan Crisis: Statement of the International Committee of the Fourth International (1994) 
Globalization and the International Working Class: A Marxist Assessment (1998) , the ICFI analysis of the globalization of the world economy and its impact to the working class movement.

See also
 Posadism

References

External links
The 'Open Letter' to Trotskyists Throughout the World SWP resolution, 1953
For Early Reunification of the World Trotskyist Movement SWP resolution, 1963
David North, The Founding of the ICFI
David North, About Cannon's Open Letter
David North, The 1985 Split
David North, The Workers' League becomes the Socialist Equality Party
World Socialist Web Site Published by the International Committee of the Fourth International (ICFI)
"Gelfand's Open Letter to the SWP leadership"
Gelfand Case: A Legal History of the Exposure of US Government Agents in the Leadership of the Socialist Workers Party by Alan Gelfand (1985), Vol. 1 , Vol. 2 
FBI file on Jack Soble, GPU agent References to GPU assassin Zborowski begin on page 17 (also at top of page 41); references to "SOFIE" (a.k.a. Sylvia Franklin) who acted as Trotsky's secretary in Coyoacán, begin near the bottom of page 27 to page 28, also on pages 49 to 50.